Greg Sammons (born 31 December 1987) is an English rugby union hooker. He joined Leicester's senior squad in the 2008–2009 season from the academy. 
He initially joined the academy as a back rower before moving to the front row.
In his youth he was a district Basketball player in Solihull.

He now plays in Italy for Mogliano. His younger brother Ashley Sammons is a professional football player for Birmingham City F.C.

References

1987 births
Living people
Bedford Blues players
Birmingham & Solihull R.F.C. players
English rugby union players
Leicester Tigers players
Rugby union hookers